Bracken is a television drama serial broadcast from 1980 to 1982 on RTÉ 1 in Ireland, depicting rural life in and around County Wicklow. Created and written by Wesley Burrowes, it starred Gabriel Byrne and Niall Tóibín.

The show is chiefly known for being the link between two long standing RTÉ series, in that Gabriel Byrne's character, Pat Barry, had first appeared in The Riordans, towards the end of that show's run. The characters of Dinny and Miley Byrne, played by Joe Lynch and Mick Lally, first appeared on this series, they were later to become the central stars of Glenroe. Each of the three series were created by Wesley Burrowes.

Cast
 Gabriel Byrne as Pat Barry
 Niall Tóibín as Edward Daly
 Joe Lynch as Dinny Byrne 
 Sean Lawlor as Peter Thompson
 Mick Lally as Miley Byrne
 Fiona Victory as Louise Daly
 Dana Wynter as Jill Daly
 Jim Fitzgerald as Barney Kenny

References

External links

 Bracken in the RTE Archives

1978 Irish television series debuts
1982 Irish television series endings
1970s Irish television series
1980s Irish television series
English-language television shows
Irish television soap operas
RTÉ original programming